Catharine Stolberg (1751–1832), was a Danish-German countess and writer. She published novels and plays, and was also known for her biography and her preserved correspondence.

References
 Bjørn, Claus (2001). Dansk Kvindebiografisk Leksikon. Rosinante. 
 Engelstoft, Povl & Dahl, Svend (1933-1944). Dansk Biografisk Leksikon. Gyldendal

1832 deaths
1751 births
18th-century Danish dramatists and playwrights
19th-century Danish dramatists and playwrights
18th-century Danish novelists
19th-century Danish novelists
18th-century Danish women writers
19th-century Danish women writers
18th-century German dramatists and playwrights
19th-century German dramatists and playwrights
18th-century German novelists
19th-century German novelists
18th-century German women writers
19th-century German women writers
Danish women novelists
Danish women dramatists and playwrights
Danish nobility
German women novelists
German women dramatists and playwrights
Catharine
18th-century Danish writers
19th-century Danish writers